Harold Traynor (4 December 1922 – 14 March 1983) was an  Australian rules footballer who played with South Melbourne in the Victorian Football League (VFL).

Notes

External links 

1922 births
1983 deaths
Australian rules footballers from Victoria (Australia)
Sydney Swans players